Elections to the various legislatures in Bosnia and Herzegovina are carried out using open Party-list proportional representation. Constituencies are numbered and are known as electoral units.

House of Representatives of Bosnia and Herzegovina

For elections to the House of Representatives of Bosnia and Herzegovina, each of the eight units is contained completely within one entity of Bosnia and Herzegovina.  In the Federation of Bosnia and Herzegovina, two cantons make up a unit; whereas in  Republika Srpska, units are based on municipalities.

House of Representatives of the Federation of Bosnia and Herzegovina

There are twelve units for elections to the subnational House of Representatives of the Federation of Bosnia and Herzegovina.  Five are cantons at large, three are sections of more populous cantons, and four contain whole small cantons and sections of larger ones.

National Assembly of Republika Srpska

The nine units for the National Assembly of Republika Srpska are based on municipalities. The current unit boundaries were drawn up for the 2014 election.

Previously there were six constituencies. In 2014, three of the most populous units were split and the remaining units were renumbered:

References

 
Bosnia and Herzegovina
Bosnia and Herzegovina politics-related lists